Zhang Songwen is a Chinese actor and acting coach. He is known for starring in the 2018 film The Shadow Play, 2020 drama The Bad Kids and the 2023 drama The Knockout.

Early life
In 2000, Zhang entered Beijing Film Academy. After graduation, he become a teaching assistant at Alma Mater.

Career
In 2009, Zhang had his first cooperation with the famous director Lou Ye in Spring Fever (2009), which was shown in competition at the 62nd Cannes Film Festival where it won the prize for best screenplay.

Later in 2017, Zhang appeared as a teacher father in End of Summer (2017). It made its world premiere in the New Currents section of the 22nd Busan International Film Festival, winning the KNN Award.

Zhang starred in the crime drama film The Shadow Play (2018), as the Chief of Construction Committee jumping to his death from a tall building. The Shadow Play received critical acclaim and several Golden Horse Awards nominations.

In 2020, Zhang portrayed an aquatic production businessman in the web television series The Bad Kids, which is based on the 2014 Zi Jinchen's novel, Bad Kid (坏小孩). The series released with critical acclaim and became a social media hit.

In 2023, Zhang portrayed a criminal lord in the criminal drama The Knockout (狂飙), who rose up step by step from a poor fishmonger at wet market 20 years ago. The drama is sponsored by Central Political and Legal Affairs Commission of CCP, portraying the achievements of its signature anti-crime campaign (打黑). However, Zhang played his character so well that people perceive this drama as the evolvement story of the underworld (黑社会) in China in the early 2000s.

Filmography

Film

Television series

References

External links 

21st-century Chinese male actors
Male actors from Guangdong
Beijing Film Academy alumni
Chinese male film actors
Chinese male television actors
Living people
1976 births